The Battle of Dofas was a battle during the 2011 Yemeni uprising between forces loyal to Yemeni leader Abdrabbuh Mansur Hadi and Islamist militant forces, possibly including elements of al-Qaeda, during which the militants destroyed an Army artillery battalion of the 39th Armored Brigade in the town of Dofas, which was being used as a main base for artillery support against the militant-held towns of Zinjibar and Jaʿār.

Background

In May 2011, about 300 Islamic militants attacked and captured the coastal city of Zinjibar (population 20,000). During the takeover of the town, the militants killed five policemen, including a high-ranking officer, and one civilian. Two more soldiers were killed in clashes with militants in Loder.

Over the next few months the military made several attempts to retake the city, but they were all repelled leaving more than 600 dead on both sides. By mid-September 2011, the military halted their attacks on Zinjibar and held positions on its outskirts.

Battle
On 4 March, militants launched an attack against an Army artillery battalion on the outskirts of Zinjibar, in the small town of Dofas, overrunning it and killing 187 soldiers and wounding 135. 32 Al-Qaeda fighters also died during the fighting. The militants attacked the Army base with booby-trapped vehicles and managed to capture armored vehicles, tanks, weapons and munitions. The military reported 55 soldiers were captured while the militant group claimed up to 73 were taken prisoner. The assault started with a diversionary attack on one end of the base, with the main militant force attacking the other end of the compound. Several car bombs were detonated in front of the gates, after which the attackers entered the base, capturing heavy weapons and turning them against the soldiers. The nearby 115th and 119th Brigades, which the artillery was supposed to support, were not able to assist the battalion due to them also being under attack. At one point they were hit by artillery from the battalion base after it had been overrun by the Islamists. Reinforcements from other nearby military bases came too late due to a sandstorm. In the town of Jaʿār, the militants paraded the captured soldiers. In the days following the attack, the military conducted air-strikes against militant positions around Zinjibar which they claimed killed 42 Al-Qaeda fighters.

The Ansar al-Sharia group that took responsibility for the attack is believed to be just a re-branding of Al-Qaeda in the Arabian Peninsula to make it more appealing to the devout rural population. Three days after the attack, the group let a Red Cross team into Jaʿār to treat 12 wounded soldiers and demanded a prisoner exchange with the government.

Aftermath
Attacks continued during the next weeks, including a suicide bombing on 13 March, near al-Bayda that killed four soldiers and left four other critically injured. After this attack militants posted a video in which they announced the capture of yet another soldier, bringing the total number of prisoners they hold to 74. They demanded an agreement to free imprisoned insurgents in exchange for the soldiers.

On 31 March, a large group of militants attacked an Army checkpoint in Lahij Governorate during the night, sparking a battle that left 20 soldiers and 4 insurgents dead. The attackers fled with heavy weapons and at least two tanks. Government forces later called in airstrikes that successfully destroyed one of the captured tanks, killing its three occupants.  Another similar attack took place on 9 April, when a base near Lowdar was briefly overrun during a battle where locals had to join the military to help drive the militants out. There were at least 44 people killed, including six civilians, twenty-four insurgents and fourteen soldiers.

References

Dofas
Dofas
2012 in Yemen
Abyan Governorate
March 2012 events in Asia